Royal Saudi Land Forces is the land warfare service branch of the Armed Forces of Saudi Arabia. It is part of the Ministry of Defense (Saudi Arabia), which is one of the two military departments of the Government of Saudi Arabia, together with the Ministry of National Guard.

History

The modern Army of Arabia has its roots in the Saudi state, which was dating to 1744, and is considered to be the birth year of the Saudi army. As of 1901 the ground forces was re-established as a separate branch of the armed forces with the starting of the modern Saudi state. and it is considered the oldest branches of the Saudi Arabia's military.

Conscription lasted up until dissolved the War chancellery. Historically, the MoW was created to unify the armies of the state under one military power. It was existed until 1933, when it was renamed "Agency of Defence" under the Finance Minister administration as Agent. By 1944, the Agency was developed (MoD) and incorporated into the Armed Forces Inspectorate.

Other events that led to an expansion of the Saudi Army were the Arab–Israeli conflict in 1948, the fall of Shah Mohammad Reza Pahlavi in the Iranian Revolution in 1979 and the subsequent fears of possible hostile's actions, and as well as the Gulf War in 1990. In the year 2000, Saudi Arabia's government spent billions of dollars to expand the Saudi military including the Army. The current minister of defense is Prince Mohammad bin Salman, who was appointed on 23 January 2015.

Wars involved

 Wars of Najed (1744–88)
 Saudi–Mamluk War (1790–1811)
 Ottoman–Saudi War (1811–18)
 Saudi Civil War (1865–75)
 Ottoman campaign II (1870–71)
 Battle of Arwa (1883)
 Battle of Mulayda (1891)
Battle of Riyadh III
Battle of Dilam (1903)
Saudi–Rashidi War (1903–07)
Battle of Hadia (1910)
Battle of al-Kut (1913)
Battle of Jarrab (1915)
Battle of Kinzaan (1915)
Saudi–Hashemite War (1918–19)
Kuwait-Saudi War (1919–20)
Battle of Hail (1921)
Saudi-Transjordan War (1922)
Battle of Hejaz II (1924–25)
Ikhwan Revolt (1927–30)
 Mutawakkilite War (1934)
 1948 Arab–Israeli War more than 3,000 Saudi troops participated in combat against Israel.
 1967 RSLF deployed over 20,000 troops in Jordan.
 1969 Al-Wadiah War. South Yemeni Forces invaded Al-Wadiah, a Saudi town, but later were defeated by the Saudi Army.
 1973 during the Yom Kippur War, Saudi Arabia airlifted a light armored battalion of Panhard AML-90s and 3,000 troops to Syria four days after the conflict began. The Saudi expeditionary forces participated in a number of relatively minor clashes with the IDF between October 16-19, mostly in concert with the Jordanian 40th Armored Brigade.
 1979 Grand Mosque seizure. The Saudi army and SANG, together with Pakistani and French commandoes, reclaimed the mosque from extremist insurgents.
 Gulf War (1990–91) Together with the allied forces, the Saudi army and SANG played a major part in the Battle of Khafji and the Liberation of Kuwait.
 2007–10 Houthi Insurgency. Yemeni Houthis attacked southern Saudi Arabia and were defeated by the Saudi army.
 2015 Saudi Arabian-led intervention in Yemen at the request of the Yemeni president to repel Houthi rebels allied with the deposed Ali Abdullah Saleh, as part of the Yemeni Civil War (2015–present).

Structure

The combat strength of the Saudi Army consists of 4 Armoured, 5 Mechanized, 2 Light Infantry (1 Royal Guards,  1 Special Forces) Brigades. The Saudi Army deployed the 12th Armoured Brigade and 6th Mechanized Brigade at King Faisal Military City in the Tabuk area. It deployed the 4th Armoured Brigade, and 11th Mechanized Brigade at King Abdul Aziz Military City in the Khamis Mushayt area. It deployed the 20th Mechanized Brigade and 8th Mechanized Brigade at King Khalid Military City near Hafr al Batin. The 10th Mechanized Brigade is deployed at Sharawrah, which is near the border with Yemen and about 150 kilometers from Zamak.

Despite the addition of a number of units and increased mobility achieved during the 1970s and 1980s, the army's personnel complement has expanded only moderately since a major buildup was launched in the late 1960s. The army has been chronically understrength, in the case of some units by an estimated 30 to 50 percent. These shortages have been aggravated by a relaxed policy that permitted considerable absenteeism and by a serious problem of retaining experienced technicians and noncommissioned officers (NCOs). The continued existence of a separate national guard also limited the pool of potential army recruits.

Armor
 4th (King Khaled) Armoured Brigade
 6th (King Fah'd) Armoured Brigade
 7th (Prince Sultan) Armoured Brigade
 8th (King Fah'd) Armoured Brigade
 10th (King Faisal) Armoured Brigade
 12th (Khalid ibn al-Walid) Armoured Brigade

A typical Saudi armoured brigade has an armoured reconnaissance company, three tank battalions with 35 tanks each, a mechanized infantry battalion with AIFVs/APCs, and an artillery battalion with 18 self-propelled guns. It also has an army aviation company, an engineer company, a logistic battalion, a field workshop, and a medical company.

Mechanized
 11th Mechanized Brigade
 12th Mechanized Brigade
 13th Mechanized Brigade
 14th Mechanized Brigade
 20th Mechanized Brigade

A typical Saudi mechanized brigade has an armoured reconnaissance company, one tank battalion with 40 tanks, three mechanized infantry battalions with AIFVs/APCs, and an artillery battalion with 18 self-propelled guns. It also has an army aviation company, an engineer company, a logistic battalion, a field workshop, and a medical company. It has 24 anti-tank guided weapons launchers and four mortar sections with a total of eight  mortars.

Infantry
 16th (King Saud) Light motorized infantry brigade
 17th (Abu Bakr Assiddeeq) Light motorized infantry brigade
 18th (King Abdullah) Light motorized infantry brigade
 19th (Umar ibn Al-Khattab) Light motorized infantry brigade
Each infantry brigade consists of three motorized battalions, an artillery battalion, and a support battalion. Army brigades should not be confused with Saudi Arabian National Guard brigades.

Airborne Units and Special Security Forces
 The 1st Airborne Brigade
 4th Airborne Battalion
 5th Airborne Battalion
 64th Special Forces Brigade
 85th Special Forces Battalion

The Airborne Brigade is normally deployed near Tabuk. The Airborne Brigade has two parachute battalions and three Special Forces companies. Saudi Arabia is expanding its Special Forces and improving their equipment and training to help deal with the threat of terrorism. The Special Forces have been turned into independent fighting units to help deal with terrorists, and report directly to Prince Sultan.

Artillery Battalions
 five artillery battalions
 14th FA (Towed, 155) Battalion
 15th FA (MLRS) Battalion
 18th Missile (MLRS) Battalion

Aviation
 1st Aviation Group
 2nd Aviation Group
 3rd Aviation Group
 4th Aviation Group

The separate Royal Guard Regiment consists of four light infantry battalions.

Ranks

RSLF officer

RSLF enlisted

Equipment

See also 

 Armed Forces of  Saudi Arabia
 Royal Saudi Navy
 Royal Saudi Air Force

References

Army
Military units and formations established in 1744
Armies by country
18th-century establishments in the Arabian Peninsula
1744 establishments in Asia